498A: The Wedding Gift is a 2012 drama film set in New Delhi, India. It is written and directed by Suhaib Ilyasi and depicts the misuse of anti-dowry laws.

Plot inspiration
Producers of 498A: The Wedding Gift maintain that the story of the film is not based on Suhaib Ilyasi's story, but maintain that it was inspired by the death of Syed Makhdoom, a Canadian national and a computer engineer by profession, who ended his life on 5 April 2009 in Bangalore, leaving four suicide notes and a dying video message on his mobile phone.

References

External links
 
 
  False Complaint Sarkar vs Momin Ali  (1340/2012), Ghaziabad District Court full Judgement PDF.

2012 films
Indian drama films
Films about Indian weddings
Indian Penal Code